Otter Creek is a small unincorporated community in Pierce County, Georgia, United States, separating the cities of Patterson and Blackshear. The community includes a volunteer fire department, community center, and a popular restaurant also named "Otter Creek."

Unincorporated communities in Pierce County, Georgia
Unincorporated communities in Georgia (U.S. state)